Sympistis cherti is a moth of the family Noctuidae first described by James T. Troubridge in 2008.

Adults are on wing from mid to late July to August.

References

cherti
Moths of North America
Fauna of California